In mathematics, the classical Möbius plane (named after August Ferdinand Möbius) is the Euclidean plane supplemented by a single point at infinity. It is also called the inversive plane because it is closed under inversion with respect to any generalized circle, and thus a natural setting for planar inversive geometry.

An inversion of the Möbius plane with respect to any circle is an involution which fixes the points on the circle and exchanges the points in the interior and exterior, the center of the circle exchanged with the point at infinity. In inversive geometry a straight line is considered to be a generalized circle containing the point at infinity; inversion of the plane with respect to a line is a Euclidean reflection.

More generally, a Möbius plane is an incidence structure with the same incidence relationships as the classical Möbius plane. It is one of the Benz planes: Möbius plane, Laguerre plane and Minkowski plane.

Relation to affine planes

Affine planes are systems of points and lines that satisfy, amongst others, the property that two points determine exactly one line. This concept can be generalized to systems of points and circles, with each circle being determined by three non-collinear points. However, three collinear points determine a line, not a circle. This drawback can be removed by adding a point at infinity to every line. If we call both circles and such completed lines cycles, we get an incidence structure in which every three points determine exactly one cycle.

In an affine plane the parallel relation between lines is essential. In the geometry of cycles, this relation is generalized to the touching relation. Two cycles touch each other if they have just one point in common. This is true for two tangent circles or a line that is tangent to a circle. Two  completed lines touch if they have only the point at infinity in common, so they are parallel. The touching relation has the property
These properties essentially define an axiomatic Möbius plane. But the classical Möbius plane is not the only geometrical structure that satisfies the properties of an axiomatic Möbius plane. A simple further example of a Möbius plane can be achieved if one replaces the real numbers by rational numbers. The usage of complex numbers (instead of the real numbers) does not lead to a Möbius plane, because in the complex affine plane the curve  is not a circle-like curve, but a hyperbola-like one. Fortunately there are a lot of fields (numbers) together with suitable quadratic forms that lead to Möbius planes (see below). Such examples are called miquelian, because they fulfill Miquel's theorem. All these miquelian Möbius planes can be described by space models. The classical real Möbius plane can be considered as the geometry of circles on the unit sphere. The essential advantage of the space model is that any cycle is just a circle (on the sphere).

Classical real Möbius plane

.

The geometry of lines and circles of the euclidean plane can be homogenized (similar to the projective completion of an affine plane) by embedding it into the incidence structure 

with
,  the set of points, and

  the set of cycles.

 is called classical real Möbius plane.

Within the new structure the completed lines play no special role anymore. Obviously  has the following properties.

For any set of three points  there is exactly one cycle  which contains .

 can be described using the 
complex numbers.   represents point :

,  and

The advantage of this description is, that one checks easily that the following permutations of  map cycles on cycles.

 (3)      (reflection at )

 (4)        (reflection or inversion through the real axis)

Considering  as projective line over  one recognizes
that the mappings  generate the group  (s. PGL(2,C), Möbius transformation). The geometry  is a homogeneous structure, i.e., its automorphism group is transitive. Hence from (4) we get: For any cycle there exists an inversion. For example:  is the inversion which fixes the unit circle .  This property gives rise to the alternate name inversive plane. 

Similar to the space model of a desarguesian projective plane there exists a
space model for the geometry  which omits the formal difference between cycles defined by lines and cycles defined by circles: The geometry  is isomorphic to the geometry of circles on a sphere. The isomorphism can be performed by a suitable stereographic projection. For example:

 is a projection with center  and maps  
the x-y-plane onto the sphere with equation , midpoint  and radius .
the circle with equation  into the plane . That means, the image of a circle is a plane section of the sphere and hence a circle (on the sphere) again.  The corresponding planes do not contain center .
the line  into the plane  . So, the image of a line is a circle (on the sphere) through point  but not containing point .

Axioms of a Möbius plane

The incidental behavior of the classical real Möbius plane gives reason to the following definition of an axiomatic 
Möbius plane.

An incidence structure  with point set  and set of cycles
 is called Möbius plane if the following axioms hold:

 A1: For any three points  there is exactly one cycle  that contains .
 A3: Any cycle contains at least three points. There is at least one cycle.

One should not expect that the axioms above define the classical real Möbius plane. There are a lot of examples of axiomatic Möbius planes which are different from the classical one (see below). Similar to the minimal model of an affine plane one find the minimal model of a Möbius plane. It consists of  points:

.  
Hence: .

The connection between the classical Möbius plane and the real affine plane can be found in a similar way between the minimal model of a Möbius plane and the minimal model of an affine plane. This strong connection is typical for Möbius planes and affine planes (see below).

For a Möbius plane  and  we define structure 
and call it the residue at point P.

For the classical model the residue  at point  is the underlying real affine plane. The essential meaning of the residue shows the following theorem.

Theorem:
Any residue of a Möbius plane is an affine plane.

This theorem allows to use the plenty results on affine planes for investigations on Möbius planes and gives rise to an equivalent definition of a Möbius plane:

Theorem:
An incidence structure  is a Möbius plane  if and only if the following 
property is fulfilled
A': For any point  the residue  is an affine plane.

For finite Möbius planes, i.e. , we have (similar to affine planes):

 Any two cycles of a Möbius plane have the same number of points.

This gives reason for the following definition:
 
From combinatorics we get

Let  be a Möbius plane of order . Then a) any residue  is an affine plane of order ,  b) ,  c)

Miquelian Möbius planes

Looking for further examples of Möbius planes it seems promising to generalize the classical construction starting with a quadratic form  on an affine plane over a field  for defining circles. But, just to replace the real numbers  by any field  and to keep the classical quadratic form  for describing the circles does not work in general. For details one should look into the lecture note below. So, only for suitable pairs of fields and quadratic forms one gets Möbius planes . They are (as the classical model) characterized by huge homogeneity and the following theorem of Miquel.

Theorem (Miquel):
For the Möbius plane  the following is true:
If for any 8 points 
which can be assigned to the vertices
of a cube such that the points in 5 faces correspond to concyclical 
quadruples than the sixth quadruple of points is concyclical, too.

The converse is true, too.

Theorem (Chen): 
Only a Möbius plane  satisfies the Theorem of Miquel.

Because of the last Theorem a Möbius plane  is called a miquelian Möbius plane.

Remark: The minimal model of a Möbius plane is miquelian. It is isomorphic to the Möbius plane
(For example, the unit circle   is the point set .)

Remark: If we choose   the field of complex numbers, there is no suitable quadratic form at all.

Remark: A stereographic projection shows:  is isomorphic
to the geometry of the plane
sections on a sphere (nondegenerate quadric of index 1) in projective 3-space over field .

Remark: A proof of Miquel's theorem for the classical (real) case can be found here. It is elementary and based on the theorem of an inscribed angle.

Remark: There are many Möbius planes which are not miquelian (see weblink below). The class which is most similar to miquelian Möbius planes are the ovoidal Möbius planes. An ovoidal Möbius plane is the geometry of the plane sections of an ovoid. An ovoid is a quadratic set and bears the same geometric properties as a sphere in a projective 3-space: 1) a line intersects an ovoid in none, one or two points and 2) at any point of the ovoid the set of the tangent lines form a plane, the tangent plane. A simple ovoid in real 3-space can be constructed by glueing together two suitable halves of different ellipsoids, such that the result is not a quadric. Even in the finite case there exist ovoids (see quadratic set). Ovoidal Möbius planes are characterized by the bundle theorem.

Finite Möbius planes and block designs
A block design with the parameters of the one-point extension of a finite affine plane of order , i.e. a --design, is a Möbius plane of order . 

These finite block designs satisfy the axioms defining a Möbius plane, when a circle is interpreted as a block of the design.

The only known finite values for the order of a Möbius plane are prime or prime powers.  The only known finite Möbius planes are constructed within finite projective geometries.

See also
Conformal geometry
Möbius transformation

References

W. Benz, Vorlesungen über Geometrie der Algebren, Springer (1973)
F. Buekenhout (ed.), Handbook of Incidence Geometry, Elsevier (1995) 
P. Dembowski, Finite Geometries, Springer-Verlag (1968)

External links
 Möbius plane in the Encyclopedia of Mathematics
 Benz plane in the Encyclopedia of Mathematics
 Lecture Note ''Planar Circle Geometries', an Introduction to Möbius-, Laguerre- and Minkowski Planes

Classical geometry
Incidence geometry
Planes (geometry)